Empis trigramma is a species of dance flies, in the fly family Empididae. The thorax with yellowish sides, with three broad dark stripes. Abdomen is shining yellowish, with a dark central stripe.

References

Empis
Asilomorph flies of Europe
Insects described in 1822
Taxa named by Christian Rudolph Wilhelm Wiedemann